Hammarberg is a Swedish surname. Notable people with the surname include:

Irwin Goodman (1943–1991), Finnish singer (real name: Antti Hammarberg)
Thomas Hammarberg (born 1942), Swedish diplomat

Swedish-language surnames